
Gmina Pyrzyce is an urban-rural gmina (administrative district) in Pyrzyce County, West Pomeranian Voivodeship, in north-western Poland.

Villages
Apart from the town of Pyrzyce, Gmina Pyrzyce contains the villages and settlements of Brzesko, Brzezin, Czernice, Giżyn, Górne, Krzemlin, Krzemlinek, Letnin, Mechowo, Mielęcin, Młyny, Nieborowo, Nowielin, Obromino, Okunica, Ostrowica, Pstrowice, Ryszewko, Ryszewo, Rzepnowo, Stróżewo, Turze and Żabów.

Neighbouring gminas
Gmina Pyrzyce is bordered by the gminas of Banie, Bielice, Kozielice, Lipiany, Myślibórz, Przelewice, Stare Czarnowo and Warnice.

References
Polish official population figures 2006

Pyrzyce
Pyrzyce County